The Neya is a river in Kostroma Oblast, Russia. It is a tributary of the Unzha (in Volga's drainage basin).

The town of Neya is situated by the river Neya.

References 

Rivers of Kostroma Oblast